Green Township is one of the sixteen townships of Ross County, Ohio, United States.  The 2000 census found 4,492 people in the township, 3,460 of whom lived in the unincorporated portions of the township.

Geography
Located in the northern part of the county, it borders the following townships:
Pickaway Township, Pickaway County - north
Salt Creek Township, Pickaway County - northeast corner
Colerain Township - east
Harrison Township - southeast corner
Springfield Township - south
Union Township - west

The village of Kingston is located in northern Green Township.

Name and history
It is one of sixteen Green Townships statewide.

Government
The township is governed by a three-member board of trustees, who are elected in November of odd-numbered years to a four-year term beginning on the following January 1. Two are elected in the year after the presidential election and one is elected in the year before it. There is also an elected township fiscal officer, who serves a four-year term beginning on April 1 of the year after the election, which is held in November of the year before the presidential election. Vacancies in the fiscal officership or on the board of trustees are filled by the remaining trustees.

References

External links
County website

Townships in Ross County, Ohio
Townships in Ohio